Rock Ventures LLC is the holding company for businessman Dan Gilbert's portfolio of companies, investments, and real estate. It is based in Detroit, Michigan and is also engaged in community development in both Detroit and Cleveland, Ohio. Its over 110 affiliated companies include the Cleveland Cavaliers, Hollywood Casino at Greektown, and Rocket Mortgage.

History
Rock Ventures was founded by Dan Gilbert.

Companies
Rock Ventures is the parent company of more than 110 companies.

Financial services
Based around Rocket Mortgage, Rock Ventures owns a number of complementary financial service companies, including:
Amrock
 Benzinga
 In-House Realty
 Instore
 InStore Finance
 One Reverse Mortgage LLC
 Rocket Mortgage
 Rock Connections
 Rock Processing

Gaming
Developed under Jack Entertainment, Rock Ventures holds ownership stake in number of gaming ventures, including:
 Jack Cleveland Casino
 Jack Thistledown Racino

Investment
Rock Ventures has invested in a number of companies, primarily in Detroit and Cleveland areas, including:

Real estate
Rock Ventures owns a number of real estate investment, development, and service companies, including:
 Bedrock Management Services LLC
 dPop!
 Rocket Fiber
 Rock Companies

Sports
Rock Ventures owns, or is the majority owner of, a number of sports companies, including:
 Cleveland Cavaliers
 Cleveland Charge
 Cleveland Monsters
 Fathead
 Rocket Mortgage FieldHouse
 Veritix
 Xenith LLC

Technology
Rock Ventures is an owner of a number of technology companies, including:

Real estate properties
Rock Ventures is an owner of over 75 real estate properties, primarily in Detroit, including:
 1001 Woodward
 Book Tower
 Chrysler House
 David Stott Building
 Federal Reserve Bank of Chicago Detroit Branch Building
 First National Building
 Globe Tobacco Building
 L. B. King and Company Building
 One Campus Martius
 One Detroit Center
 One Woodward Avenue
 The Qube
 Savoyard Centre
 Vinton Building
 Wright-Kay Building

Community development
Rock Ventures is engaged in community development, philanthropy, and government relations in both Detroit, Michigan and Cleveland, Ohio.

References

External links

 

 
Companies based in Detroit
Conglomerate companies of the United States
Holding companies of the United States
Investment companies of the United States